{{Infobox weapon
| name               = Barak 8 / LR-SAM / MR-SAM
| image              = Salon du Bourget 20090619 077.jpg
| image_size         = 
| alt                = 
| caption            = Scale-model of the Barak-8ER concept unveiled at the 2009 Paris Air Show. Visible below is the addition of a large diameter 1st stage booster.
| type               = Medium to long-range surface-to-air missile 
| service            = 2016−present
| wars               = 
| designer           = Israel Aerospace IndustriesDefence Research and Development Organisation
| number             = 
| spec_label         = 
| length             =  (w/out booster)
| width              = 
| height             = 
| diameter           = * at main missile body
 initial-stage rocket motor, Barak-8ER version
| passengers         = 
| origin             = India, Israel
| is_missile         = yes
| is_UK              = yes
| used_by            = Indian Navy Indian Air Force  Indian Army Israeli NavyAzerbaijan Air Force
| design_date        = 
| manufacturer       = Bharat Dynamics Limited Bharat Electronics LimitedRafael Advanced Defense Systems
| unit_cost          = 
| production_date    = 2017−present
| variants           = 
| weight             =  (w/out booster)
| part_length        = 
| crew               = 
| detonation         = hard kill
| filling            = 60 kg
| armour             = 
| primary_armament   = 
| secondary_armament = 
| engine             = smokeless dual pulsed rocket motor; 1-stage or 2-stage rocket variants
| engine_power       = 
| pw_ratio           = 
| payload_capacity   = 
| transmission       = 
| suspension         = 
| clearance          = 
| fuel_capacity      = 
| vehicle_range      = *0.5 km-70 km (single-stage rocket) version: Barak-8 MRSAM, Barak LRAD"
0.5 km-100 km (single stage rocket) version: Barak-8 LRSAM"
0.5 km-150 km (2-stage rocket) version: Barak ER
| speed              = * Mach 2 (LRSAM variant)
 Mach 3+ (MRSAM variant)
| guidance           = *2-way datalink w/ WCS
Active radar homing
Infrared Homing Guidance
| steering           = 
| wingspan           = 
| propellant         = 
| ceiling            = *
: Barak LRAD & MRAD'
 Barak ER| altitude           = 
| depth              = 
| boost              = 
| accuracy           = 
| launch_platform    = * 8 cell VLS module
 8 cell, double stacked land launcher
| transport          = 
}}

Barak 8 (lit. "Lightning"), also known as LR-SAM or MR-SAM, is an Indo-Israeli jointly developed surface-to-air missile (SAM) system, designed to defend against any type of airborne threat including aircraft, helicopters, anti-ship missiles, and UAVs as well as ballistic missiles, cruise missiles and combat jets. Both maritime and land-based variants of the system exist.

Barak 8 was jointly developed by India's Defence Research & Development Organisation (DRDO)  and Israel Aerospace Industries (IAI). The Barak 8 missile defence system is produced by Israel's Directorate of Research and Development (DDR&D), Elta Systems, Rafael Advanced Defense Systems and India's Bharat Dynamics limited (BDL).

Background
Barak 8 is loosely based on the original Barak 1 missile and is expected to feature a more advanced seeker, alongside range extensions that will move it closer to medium range naval systems like the RIM-162 ESSM or even the SM-2 Standard. Israel successfully tested the improved Barak II missile on July 30, 2009. The radar system provides 360 degree coverage and the missiles can take down an incoming missile as close as 500 meters away from the ship. Each Barak system (missile container, radar, computers and installation) costs about $24 million. In November 2009 Israel signed a $1.1 billion contract to supply an upgraded tactical Barak 8 air defence system to India. In May 2017, India placed an order of $630 million for four ships of the Indian Navy. In September 2018, MDL and GRSE awarded Bharat Electronics Limited with a $1.28 billion contract to supply seven Barak-8 air defence systems for Project 17A-class frigates. In October 2018, Bharat Electronics Limited signed a $777 million deal with Israel Aerospace Industries to help fulfil the Barak-8 order.
Parallel to the Barak-8, IAI has completed development and is manufacturing the Barak MX system that broadens the Barak into a multi-layered air defense system employing unified smart launchers carrying Short, Medium, and Extended-Range interceptors. The Smart Launcher supports flexible deployment architecture for land and naval applications. Unlike the Barak-8 system, the interceptors, and sensors were developed exclusively by IAI to meet specific requirements from domestic and foreign customers.

Design (LR-SAM)

The Barak 8 has a length of about 4.5 meters, a diameter of 0.225 meters at missile body, and 0.54 meters at the booster stage, a wingspan of 0.94 meters and weighs 275 kg including a 60 kg warhead which detonates at proximity. The missile has maximum speed of Mach 2 with a maximum operational range of 70 km, which was later increased to ~90 km, which was later further increased to 100 km.Gen Next missile defence shield built by Israel and India clears first hurdle , The Times of India, 28 November 2015 Barak 8 features a dual pulse rocket motor as well as thrust vector control, and possesses high degrees of maneuverability at target interception range. A second motor is fired during the terminal phase, at which stage the active radar seeker is activated to home in on to the enemy track. Barak 8 has been designed to counter a wide variety of airborne threats, such as anti-ship missiles, aircraft, UAVs drones and supersonic missiles. When coupled with a modern air-defence system and multi-function surveillance track and guidance radars, such as the EL/M-2248 MF-STAR AESA on board Kolkata-class destroyers, Barak 8 enables the capability to simultaneously engage multiple targets during saturation attacks.

Israel Aerospace Industries describe Barak 8 as "an advanced, long-range missile defense and air defense system" with its main features being:IAI - Naval Barak 8  Israel Aerospace Industries
 Long Range
 Two way data link (GPS S band)
 Active Radar Seeker Missile
 360 degree coverage
 Smokeless propulsion
 Thrust vector control
 Dual pulse propulsion
 Vertical Launch
 Multiple Simultaneous Engagements
 Point defence anti-ballistic missile

 MR-SAM 
MR-SAM is the land based configuration of the missile. It consists of a command and control system, tracking radar, missile and mobile launcher systems. Each launcher will have eight such missiles in two stacks and are launched in a canister configuration. The system is also fitted with an advanced radio frequency (RF) Seeker. It has a range of 70 km.

In a 1 July 2010 report, replying to a query on the Indo-Israeli joint venture to develop a medium range surface-to-air missile, DRDO chief V. K. Saraswat told The Economic Times "More than 70 per cent of the content in the missile being developed with Israel would be indigenous."

In July 2019, the Indian Army and Air Force awarded a $100 million contract to produce 1,000 MR-SAM to Kalyani Rafael Advanced Systems (KRAS), a joint venture between the Kalyani Group and Rafael. The missiles are manufactured at Kalyani Rafael's plant in Hyderabad, Telangana, and then sent to Bharat Dynamics Limited for further integration. KRAS announced that it had begun delivery of the first batch of MR-SAM on 16 March 2021 to the Indian Air Force. The Air Force has placed order for 18 squadrons with 3 launcher vehicles, carrying 8 missiles each.

On 23 November 2020, the missile was successfully tested when a Banshee unmanned air vehicle (UAV) was hit mid-air. The entire mission trajectory from the launch to plunging into the sea was monitored by various radars and electro-optico instruments.

On 27 March 2022, DRDO carried out two tests of MR-SAM at ITR Balasore. The test was against the high speed aerial target at long range. The missile destroyed the target in a direct hit. The first test was of medium altitude at long range target and second launch was for the capability of a low altitude at short range target. The test was the user trial for the Indian Army.

Barak-8ER & Barak-ER

An ER (extended range) variant of the Barak 8 is under development, which will see the missiles maximum range increased to 150 km. Designed to engage multiple beyond visual range threats, the low launch signature Barak-8ER is understood to retain the same autopilot/inertial navigation system and active radar seeker guidance as the Barak-8, although some modifications to the software and to the missile control surfaces are likely. The booster increases the length of the missile at launch from its current 4.5 m to nearly 6 m, although the length in flight after the booster has been jettisoned may be slightly less than the base Barak-8 missile, if a TVC is not present. The missile diameter and fin spans are thought to be the same as the base Barak-8. The booster weight is currently unknown, although the missile's weight after the booster has been jettisoned is the same as that for the current Barak-8 configuration. Levy said that initial operational capability (IOC) for Barak-8ER will first be declared for the naval variant, followed by IOC for the land variant. He declined to comment on a launch customer for Barak-8ER, but noted "existing Barak-8 customers will be interested in this configuration because it offers additional capability to their current system".

Flight tests
 On 14 May 2010, the LRSAM (also called Barak-II during that time) was successfully test fired at an electronic target and met its initial objectives. The second test of the missile was planned to be held in India sometime later that same year, stated on that same report.
 On 10 November 2014, the Barak 8 was successfully test fired in Israel with all integrated operational components for both marine and land systems. "The current test validated all components of the weapon system to the satisfaction of the customer representatives," the statement said. It was the first involving a full operational scenario, the company said in a statement. The scenario began with launching the target. After being detected by the system's radar, the weapon system calculated the optimal interception point, launched the Barak 8 missile into its operational trajectory that acquired the target, and successfully intercepted it. All the weapon system's components met the test's goals successfully.
On 26 November 2015, a successful test was conducted against a fast-moving jet-powered drone by the Israeli Sa'ar 5-class corvette INS Lahav. This was also the first test done from a naval ship, and also confirmed the range extension from the previous 70 km to ~100 km.
 On 29 and 30 December 2015, the Indian Navy successfully test-fired Barak 8 LRSAM from INS Kolkata (D63). Two missiles were fired at high speed targets, during naval exercises undertaken in the Arabian Sea.

 On 30 June 2016, India test-fired a land based version of the Barak 8 surface-to-air missile for the first time from the Integrated Test Range (ITR) in Chandipur, Odisha, successfully hitting the target pilotless target aircraft (PTA) at 8:15 AM IST. the missile was again test fired for second time around noon where it again successfully hit a pilotless target aircraft over the Bay of Bengal. The test-firing of the missile was jointly carried out by Indian defence personnel, DRDO and IAI.
 On 1 July 2016 the MR SAM (land based version) was tested for the third time from the ITR at Chandipur, at 10:26 AM IST and the missile successfully hit a pilotless target aircraft, proving its reliability.
 On 20 September 2016, India successfully test fired the Barak-8. The long range missile was launched from a mobile launcher at the ITR in Chandipur at around 10:13 AM IST.
 On 25 December 2016, Azerbaijan successfully tested the missile.
 On 10 February 2017, Israel Aerospace Industries test fired the missile at sea to verify its capabilities.
 On 16 May 2017, the Indian Navy successfully test fired the MRSAM variant from INS Kochi (D64).
 On 29 November 2017, the Indian Navy test fired again the MRSAM from INS Kochi (D64).

 On 25 January 2019, the Indian Navy test fired the LRSAM from INS Chennai (D65) against an incoming aerial target flying at a low altitude.
 In 2019 May 15, the MRSAM variant was first operated in their full Joint Taskforce Coordinating (JTC) mode by the Indian Navy via their 2 Kolkata-class destroyers: INS Kochi (D64) and INS Chennai (D65). The JTC mode implements the Cooperative Engagement Capability (CEC) of the Barak-8 MRSAM system. Both ships launched the missiles but only 1 was doing the actual engagement role. The demonstration was done on India's western seaboard.
 On 22 March 2021, Israel Aerospace Industries successfully test fired Barak ER (extended range) interceptor with 150 km range and 30 km altitude.
 On 27 March 2022, Defence Research and Development Organisation (DRDO) conducted two successful flight tests of the Indian Army version of Medium Range Surface to Air Missile (MRSAM) at Integrated Test Range, Chandipur off the coast of Odisha. The first launch was to intercept a medium altitude long range target and second launch was for proving the capability of a low altitude short range target.
 On 30 March 2022, Defence Research and Development Organisation (DRDO) again conducted two successful flight tests of the Indian Army version of Medium Range Surface to Air Missile (MRSAM) at Integrated Test Range, Chandipur off the coast of Odisha within 3 days. The launches were carried out establishing the accuracy and reliability of the weapon system against targets covering the sea skimming and high altitude functionality within the envelope. With the conclusion of flight trials for different ranges and scenarios, the system has completed its development trials.
 In November 2022 the first successful test from a Sa’ar 6-class corvette was made.

 Deployment 
The Israeli Navy has commenced equipping its Sa'ar 5 corvettes with the system, the first re-fitted vessel being the INS Lahav. The Sa'ar 4.5 flotilla will be next for the upgrade. The Indian Navy has already deployed the missiles on Kolkata class-class destroyer, Visakhapatnam-class destroyers, and aircraft carrier INS Vikramaditya.Middle East Eye quoted an unnamed official from an unnamed country stating that a Barak 8 operated by the Azerbaijani Armed Forces intercepted an Iskander missile shot by Armenia towards Baku towards the end of the 2020 Nagorno-Karabakh war, adding that the firing of the Iskander convinced the Azerbaijan government to accept a ceasefire. Whether Armenia used any Iskanders during the war is disputed: there were reports on social media of Armenia using the Iskander, but Russia's defense ministry said Armenia didn't fire any Iskanders, and Azerbaijan stated it didn't detect any Iskander launches during the war.

The Indian Air Force got the first MRSAM system on 9 September 2021 which guards the Jaisalmer Air Force Station.

On 2 July 2022, Barak 8 missiles launched from the Sa'ar 5-class corvette INS Eilat shot down two reconnaissance UAVs operated by Hezbollah over the Israeli off-shore Karish gas field in the Mediterranean sea.

Operators

Current operators
 – Azerbaijan bought 12 Barak 8 missiles systems along with 75 missiles.
 – India has bought $5 billion worth of Barak 8 missiles for its Air Force, Navy and Army. Kolkata-class destroyers, Visakhapatnam-class destroyers, INS Vikramaditya, INS Vikrant and Nilgiri-class frigates 
 – Israel's Sa'ar 5-class corvettes carry the newer Barak 8 missile system, instead of Barak 1. To that end, INS Lahav'', a Sa'ar 5-class corvette live-fired the Barak 8 missile system, during a trial in late 2015. Subsequently, the navy will convert lighter Sa'ar 4.5-class corvettes in two to three years.
 – confirmed $500 million contract for Barak MX air defense missile systems.
 – confirmed $131 million contract for 2 Barak MX air defense missile systems.

Potential operators

See also

Tor missile system
Bavar-373
Sayyad-4
Ra'ad
Khordad 15
MIM-104 Patriot
RIM-66 Standard
RIM-67 Standard
Aster
CAMM
HİSAR
RIM-174 Standard ERAM
Akash
Akash-NG
VL-SRSAM
QRSAM
Barak-1
XRSAM
HQ-9

References

External links
Barak 8 on the IAI website
Jane's Naval Weapons: Barak 1/2/8
Defense Industry Daily - India & Israel Introducing MR-SAM
Defense Update - Barak-8 MR-SAM program 
The Indian Express (Oct 12/06) - What CBI does not say: Trishul a DRDO dud, that's why Barak deal
Barak SAM
IAI Barak 8 Video
Israel First Interception Test - Video
Indian Navy Barak 8 Test - Video 1
Indian Navy Barak 8 Test - Video 2

Surface-to-air missiles of Israel
Naval surface-to-air missiles
IAI missiles
21st-century surface-to-air missiles
Surface-to-air missiles of India
Anti-ballistic missiles of India
India–Israel relations
MLM products
Military equipment introduced in the 2010s